The Mozambican records in swimming are the fastest ever performances of swimmers from Mozambique, which are recognised and ratified by the Federação Moçambicana de Natação (FMN).

All records were set in finals unless noted otherwise.

Long Course (50 m)

Men

Women

Mixed relay

Short Course (25 m)

Men

Women

Mixed relay

References

Mozambique
Records
Swimming